Shawn Matthew Knight (born June 4, 1964) is a former American football defensive tackle. He was drafted in the first round by the New Orleans Saints, 11th overall in the 1987 NFL Draft. He played just three seasons in the NFL playing one season for the Saints, Denver Broncos and Arizona Cardinals each.

In his senior year at Brigham Young University, Knight recorded 16 sacks. When Knight's pro career began, he reported late to training camp and fell out of favor with the coaching staff. After his rookie season, New Orleans traded Knight to the Denver Broncos in exchange for Ted Gregory. Knight played 31 games in his NFL career, with only one start. The only official statistic that Knight recorded in 31 games was a fumble recovery.

1964 births
Living people
Sportspeople from Provo, Utah
American football defensive tackles
BYU Cougars football players
New Orleans Saints players
Denver Broncos players
Phoenix Cardinals players
Sacramento Surge players
Players of American football from Utah